The Russells Hall Estate is a residential area of Dudley, West Midlands, England. It is situated approximately one mile to the west of Dudley town centre.

The area was extensively mined for coal during the Industrial Revolution and would remain open for many years, which meant the district had become highly industrialised in the then heyday of the Black Country's industrial past. This process ceased in about 1950 when the local council earmarked the area for housing development, to rehouse hundreds of families from the dilapidated 19th century terraces which were still standing in the town centre around The Inhedge and Stafford Street.
The land at Russells Hall was then made safe and allowed to settle until house building commenced.

The first house was completed and let in 1958, and by 1966 the estate was complete, consisting of several hundred council houses and flats as well as some private houses, mostly situated around Scott's Green Close on the south side of the estate. Several more private and council properties, including about 30 council bungalows, were added in the 1970s around Middlepark Road.

Until the creation of the traffic island near Russells Hall Hospital,  it was possible to see part of the blocked up portal of a bridge which took a railway line under Kingswinford Road.

Services and facilities
The estate is served by several schools including Russells Hall Primary School on Overfield Road and the Holly Hall Academy on Scotts Green Close. Sutton School is a special school which is also located on Scotts Green Close.

The area is served by Russells Hall Hospital, a general hospital which stands on Pensnett Road to the south of the estate.

A large area of public open space exists around the centre of the estate and in 2005 was earned by Dudley council as a possible site for mass housing development.

See also
Gornal
Wrens Nest Estate
Kates Hill Estate
Kingswinford
Guest Hospital
Old Swinford Hospital School

References

External links
Sutton School website

Areas of Dudley